Damon Russell is a producer and director of television series and films. On June 29, 2016, Russell was inducted as a new member of the Academy of Motion Picture Arts and Sciences.

Filmography
 In 2005 Russell produced two episodes of Made, a series on MTV.
 In 2007 Russell produced three episodes of Flip This House, an A&E reality series.
 In 2007–2009, he produced 3 episodes of The First 48, a crime documentary series on A&E.
 Russell directed the 2011 film Snow on tha Bluff, a crime drama in reality style, about a real-life "thug" in The Bluff, Atlanta's roughest neighborhood. The film was shown at the 2011 Slamdance Film Festival and at the 2012 Brooklyn Film Festival.
 In 2012, Russell produced the Oscar-winning short film Curfew.
 In 2014, Russell produced the feature-length film Before I Disappear, which was based on Curfew.
 In 2016, Russell directed the short film Cul-de-Sac.

References

External links
 2011 Interview in Filmmaker, the Magazine of Independent Film
 Interview at DJ Smallz.com
 

American television producers
American film directors
African-American film directors
Living people
Year of birth missing (living people)
21st-century African-American people